Niclas Elving (alternatively spelled Nicklas Elving or Niclas Elfving born 6 February 1986 in Sweden) is a Swedish retired footballer who is last known to have played for Ahlafors IF in his home country in 2014. An offensive midfielder, he can operate on the wings also and is left-footed. Besides Sweden, he has played in Nicaragua.

Nicaragua

Concluding a transfer to C.D. Walter Ferretti of the Nicaraguan Primera División in January 2014 after impressing their coach, Elving debuted in their second round meeting Real Madriz and fared well, forming a duo with frontman Javier Dolmus by supplying him with assists near the end of the season.

Experienced the cataclysmic April 2014 Nicaragua earthquake while in Managua.

Comparing the league in Nicaragua to the Swedish Superettan, he stated that football there is very physical.

Personal life

The Swede idolizes Ronaldinho as well as retired Swedish international Marcus Allbäck.

References

External links 
 
 

Association football midfielders
Living people
1986 births
Swedish footballers
Swedish expatriate footballers
Expatriate footballers in Nicaragua
Allsvenskan players
Örgryte IS players